The clashes between the Hindu and Muslim communities in Muzaffarnagar district of Uttar Pradesh, India in August–September 2013, resulted in at least 62 deaths including 42 Muslims and 20 Hindus and injured 93 and left more than 50,000 people displaced. By date 17 September, the curfew was lifted from all riot affected areas and the army was also withdrawn.

The riot has been described as "the worst violence in Uttar Pradesh in recent history", with the army, as a result, being deployed in the state for the first time in last 20 years. The Supreme Court of India, while hearing petitions in relation to the riots, held the Akhilesh Yadav-led Samajwadi Party prima facie guilty of negligence in preventing the violence and ordered it to immediately arrest all those accused irrespective of their political affiliation. The Court also blamed the Central government for its failure to provide intelligence inputs to the Samajwadi Party-governed state government in time to help sound alerts. In 2021, a local court allowed the Yogi Adityanath-led BJP government to withdraw a case of inciting violence against 12 BJP leaders involved in the riots.

In 2022, BJP MLA Vikram Singh Saini along with 11 others were sentenced to two years imprisonment by a special which convicted them of rioting and other offences.

Initial clashes
On 21 August 2013, communal clashes were reported from Muzaffarnagar and police registered cases against 150 people and 14 persons were taken into custody. Clashes between two communities, Hindus 
and Muslims, in Shamli and Muzaffarnagar grew on 27 August 2013. The original cause of the rioting is disputed according to bipartisan claims largely concerning the affected communities. In this case, the cause of this rioting alternates between a traffic accident and an eve-teasing incident. According to the first version, the cause was a minor traffic accident involving some youths which then spiralled out of control when it eventually took on religious overtones. In the second version, a girl from the Hindu Jat community was allegedly harassed in an eve-teasing incident by one Muslim youth in Kawal village. In retaliation, Hindu relatives of the girl in question, Sachin Singh and Gaurav Singh, killed the youth named Shahnawaz Qureshi. The two brothers were lynched by a Muslim mob when they tried to escape. The police arrested eleven members of the girl's family for killing the Muslim youth. According to Zee News report some locals, the police did not act against the killers of the Hindu brothers. According to police records, Gaurav and Sachin picked a fight with Shahnawaz over a motorcycle accident. While it has been widely reported that the fight was sparked off when Shahnawaz harassed Gaurav and Sachin's cousin sister, the FIR in the murder makes no mention of sexual harassment or molestation. According to the other version the girl who was allegedly harassed by Shahnawaz commented that she had not gone to Kawal or known anybody by name of Shahnawaz. In the FIR registered for Shahnawaz's death, five people along with Sachin and Gaurav were named as responsible for his death. The reports mentions that the seven men entered Shahnawaz's home, took him out and killed him with swords and knives; he died on the way to the hospital. In the FIR registers for Sachin and Gaurav's death, seven other men were reported to be responsible; that episode was sparked by an altercation after Mujassim and Gaurav were involved in a bike accident.

After news of the killings spread, the members of both communities attacked each other. The police took possession of the three dead bodies, and temporarily brought the situation under control. The authorities also deployed Provincial Armed Constabulary personnel to Kawal.

In September 2013, fresh riots sparked off and around 11 people including TV journalist Rajesh Verma were killed and more than 34 were injured after which indefinite curfew was clamped and the army deployed to help maintain law and order.

Gathering of masses
The killing of the three youths in Kawal village started echoing across the district. On 30 August, two days after the incident, despite ban on assembly of crowd, Muslim religious leaders gathered after Friday prayers and local Bahujan Samaj Party (BSP) and Congress leaders had hijacked the Muslim meeting demanding justice for the Kawal incident and made inflammatory speeches. Also, local Bharatiya Janata Party (BJP) leaders allegedly gave an incendiary speech instigating the Hindu farmers on 31 August. A First Information Report (FIR) has been lodged against all the leaders. After the meeting, the farmers were attacked and killed on their way home by mob with assault rifles and weapons.

Jauli Canal Incident
Clashes between the two communities occurred at low frequencies for the next two weeks. The Beti Bachao Mahapanchayat, attended by lacs of people, proved to be inflammatory as it was allowed to be held by the district administration, despite imposition of 144 Crpc in the area, around 2,000 Hindus  returning from Panchayat were ambushed by  Muslim mob armed with assault rifles and other sophisticated weapons near Jauli Canal on 7 September. The mobs had set fire on 18 tractor trollies and 3 motorbikes. According to an eyewitness account, the bodies were dumped into the canal. Although six bodies were recovered, it was rumoured that hundreds were missing. Bodies of three Jats were found at the site of violence and three Hindus bodies were fished out from Jauli Canal. The District Magistrate agreed that many people were missing, but doubted whether they had been killed or had migrated earlier from the village. Survivors of the Jauli Canal incident added that the policemen who were watching the assault did not help the victims, as they had said that 'they do not have orders to act'. This Jauli Canal incident aroused Jats to go on a rampage against Muslims with the claim that the latter were responsible for the killings. This led to the riots, which killed around 42 Muslim people and 20 Hindus (including a news reporter and a photographer). The casualties occurred before the Army was deployed and a curfew was imposed in Muzaffarnagar and its surrounding Shamli district.

Even with the curfew and use of army the clashes continued for the next three days, with casualties increasing to 43 by 12 September 2013. A state home department official said that 38 people died in Muzaffarnagar, 3 in Baghpat, and one each in Saharanpur and Meerut.

Sexual violence
The first case of gang-rape was registered in the aftermath of the riots from the village of Fugana in Jogiya Kheda. Later two more cases of rape were registered in October. It was reported on 15 November 2013 that a total of 13 rape and sexual harassment cases were registered over the past two months of rioting and the report named 111 people in the incidents but no arrests had been made until then.

Aftermath

Mahapanchayat in Sardhana
A Mahapanchayat (grand council) of 40 villages was held in Khera, Sardhana on 29 September 2013 to protest against the Uttar Pradesh government charging the local BJP MLA Sangeet Singh Som under the National Security Act. The crowd became violent when the police began to brandish sticks. The situation turned tense when a rumour spread that a youth injured in police action had died. Crowd set fire police jeeps and other vehicles.

Repercussions
On 30 October 3 people were killed and 1 injured after a clash between two communities in Mohammadpur Raisingh village of Muzaffarnagar district. Police forces were deployed and an alert was sounded in the entire district. The incident is widely seen as repercussion of the violence in September.
On 4 July 2014, a local court has recorded the statement of a witness and deferred until 16 July the hearing in the Kawal killing case here.

Action
Approximately 1,000 army troops were deployed and curfew was imposed in the violence-hit areas. 10,000 Provincial Armed Constabulary (PAC) personnel, 1,300 Central Reserve Police Force (CRPF) troopers and 1,200 Rapid Action Force (RAF) personnel were deployed to control the situation.

Around 10,000 to 12,000 preventive arrests were made by the police as of 11 September 2013. They cancelled 2,300 arms licenses, seized 2,000 arms, and filed seven cases under the National Security Act.

Approximately 50,000 people have been displaced. Some of them took shelter at ten state-run relief camps.

By 31 August 2013, five FIRs were registered in connection with the case and eleven people have so far been arrested and booked under various charges, including that of rioting and murder. Police arrested several Bhartiya Janta Party leaders for inciting communal violence including Sangeet Som, Rashtriya Lok Dal leader Dharamvir Baliyan, party's district president Ajit Rathi and ten other political activists when they tried to visit communal violence hit Kawal village of Muzaffarnagar district.

Investigation
Seventeen FIRs have been lodged against leaders including one for the Mahapanchayat (great council) which organised by the Bharatiya Kisan Union leaders. The Uttar Pradesh Government announced a one-member judicial commission composed of Justice Vishnu Sahay, a retired Allahabad High Court judge on 9 September 2013. The commission has been asked to submit a report about the violence within two months. The UP government also removed five senior officials of the police and the administration from Muzaffarnagar for their poor handling of the situation.

Misuse of social media
Chief Judicial Magistrate issued non-bailable warrants against 16 politicians. On 20 August 2013, BSP MP Kadir Rana was booked for his alleged hate speech in Khalapar area of the city. He was absconding but surrendered on 17 December 2013 and was sent to judicial custody. BJP MLA Sangeet Som was arrested for allegedly uploading a fake video that shows a Muslim mob brutally murdering a Hindu youth and delivering provocative speeches.

Sting operation
A sting operation done by Headlines Today revealed that UP Cabinet Minister Azam Khan ordered police officers to release Muslims and not take action against them. However, Azam Khan has denied the charges.

Response
Political parties such as Bahujan Samaj Party, Bharatiya Janata Party, Rashtriya Lok Dal and Muslim organizations including Jamiat Ulama-i-Hind demanded the dismissal of ruling Samajwadi Party government and imposition of President's rule in the state.

The failure of UP government to take prompt action is usually attributed to Akhilesh Yadav's indecision. According to a report in The Caravan, one reason for the hesitation may have been the response to a law and order directive weeks before the riots. Despite a ban on the activities of Vishwa Hindu Parishad, many of the organisations activists' managed to reach Ayodhya for a campaign. Akhilesh's government may have feared a similar undermining of their authority if they tried to ban the meeting of Mahapanchayat.

Home Minister Sushilkumar Shinde informed the press that he had already warned the Uttar Pradesh government about the escalating communal tensions there, for which Akhilesh Yadav had promised preventive measures.

Senior Samajwadi Party leader and Minority Welfare Minister Azam Khan was absent from Party's national executive meeting which was held at Agra. He is reportedly unhappy with the manner in which the district administration handled the situation in Muzaffarnagar.

Sompal Shastri, who was a candidate of Samajwadi Party from Baghpat, refused to contest 2014 Loksabha polls.

In a Public Interest Litigation filed by a victim of the violence, Mohammed Haroon and others in the Supreme Court, the number of deaths was claimed to be over 200.

Relief camps
State Government has organised relief camps in Muzaffarnagar and Shamli districts for riot victims of 9,000 families, with over 50,000 members.

According to district magistrates of Muzaffarnagar and Shamli, 3,500 families comprising over 23,000 members in Muzaffarnagar and 3,000 families consisting of over 15,000 persons are staying in camps in Shamli.

In Muzaffarnagar there are three relief camps where about 1,000 persons of one community have taken shelter while about 3,200 families of another community are staying in another 2 camps. In Shamli they are running 14 relief camps where foodgrains, milk, and water are provided to the families.

Deaths in camps
As of 22 October 2013, the National Human Rights Commission (NHRC), has said that seven deaths have occurred in the Loi relief camp in the aftermath of last month's riots in Muzaffarnagar even as organisers at Malakpur camp in Shamli district admitted that eight babies died at the camp. In Joula camp out of 30 deliveries in the camp three babies had died.
 In December, Al Jazeera English reported that an additional 30 children had "died due to the harsh cold".

Book
The book Living Apart: Communal violence and forced displacement in Muzaffarnagar and Shamli, based on a field report conducted between March and July 2016, chronicles the lives of the victims of the Muzaffarnagar riots and reflects on the violence that occurred. The book also offers criticism for the apparent apathy of the state government for the victims.

The novella In The Name of Blasphemy, written by Neeraj Agnihotri, is also set in the backdrop of Muzaffarnagar riots, talking mainly about the suffering and brutality caused by the riots in the name of religion.

Censure and indictment
A report composed by a six-member team of the Center for Policy Analysis, comprising Harsh Mander, Kamal Chenoy, John Dayal, Seema Mustafa, Sukumar Muralidharan, and E.N. Rammohan, censured members of the Samajwadi Party(SP) and the Bharatiya Janata Party(BJP) for their role in the violence. According to the report, the violence was 

The Justice Vishnu Sahai commission, which made an enquiry into the 2013 Muzaffarnagar riots, blamed members of the SP and the BJP for being involved in the violence. The commission also blamed senior police and administrative officials for errors which led to the escalation of the violence.

On 12 October 2022, BJP MLA Vikram Singh Saini was convicted and sentenced to 2-years in prison in the riots case. Saini along with 11 others were sentenced to two years imprisonment by a special MP/MLA court which convicted them of rioting and other offences and also imposed a fine of Rs 10,000 each.

See also
 Religious harmony in India
 Religious violence in India
 Godhra Train Burning

References

External links
 Muzaffarnagar: When the Jat bonding helped 4,000 Muslims return home, The Indian Express
 Thread Bared, Outlook
 Muzaffarnagar riots 2013: No justice, survivors fend for themselves, www.viewsheadlines.com

Muzaffarnagar riots, 2013
History of Uttar Pradesh (1947–present)
Muzaffarnagar district
Muzaffarnagar riots, 2013
Muzaffarnagar riots, 2013
Sexual violence at riots and crowd disturbances
2013 Muzaffarnagar violence
August 2013 events in India
September 2013 events in India
Anti-Muslim violence in India
2013 murders in Asia
2013 murders in India
Massacres in India